Betwixt! is a musical comedy conceived and written by Ian McFarlane.  It also played a concert version in the West End at the Ambassadors Theatre.

Production History

2008 London Fringe
The show premiered in The King's Head Theatre London on 6 May 2008 and finished its first run on 22 June 2008. The production was directed by Kate Golledge, choreographed by Lucie Pankhurst with musical direction by Robert Emery. The cast included Abi Finley as Miranda.

2008 Concert
On 14 October 2008, Betwixt! played at the Ambassadors Theatre, produced by Christopher D. Clegg. The cast included Tim Howar as Bailey, Rosemary Ashe as Langwidere, Sarah Lark as April McScoup, Sheridan Smith as Princess Ariella and Stefan Booth as Haydn Prince/Prince Haydn. The cast also included the London Gay Men's Chorus as "The Taravatanians" and an ensemble provided by Arts Ed drama school.

2011 West End
Producer Christopher D. Clegg brought the musical back to London in 2011 with a production in the smaller Off West End space at Trafalgar Studios. The show featured several new songs, with direction by Ian McFarlane. The production opened on 26 July and ran until 10 September.

Cast
 The Princess/the Nymph Queen/the Enchantress - Ellen Greene
 Prince Haydn/Haydn Prince/the Great Garbo - Peter Duncan
 Bailey - Benedict Salter
 Cooper - Steven Webb
 Miranda - Ashleigh Gray

External links
Official Betwixt! The Musical website
Time Out London's review of Betwixt
 Interview with Benedict Salter
The Times Top Five Theatre

Musical Numbers
From the 2011 West End Production

Act I
Opening
How Do You Know 'Til You Try Me (Which You Haven't and You Should)?
The Embassy's Predicament
Eyes of a Child
Fabulous Man
Just One Kiss

Act II
Miranda's Aria
Strange Sort of Love Song
How Do You Know 'Til You Try Me (Which You Haven't and You Should)? (Reprise)
Eyes of a Child (Reprise)
Fabulous Plan
Prince Haydn's Vision/Strange Sort of Love Song (Reprise)
Paparazzi Rag
Between
Finale

References

2008 musicals
British musicals